Stefano Giantorno (born September 27, 1991) is a Brazilian rugby sevens player. He plays for the Argentine club San Luis in the Torneo de la URBA.

References

External links 
 
 

1991 births
Living people
Male rugby sevens players
Brazilian rugby union players
Olympic rugby sevens players of Brazil
Brazil international rugby sevens players
Rugby sevens players at the 2016 Summer Olympics
São José Rugby Clube players
Rugby sevens players at the 2019 Pan American Games
Pan American Games competitors for Brazil
Brazilian rugby sevens players
Brazil international rugby union players
Brazilian expatriate sportspeople in Argentina
Brazilian expatriate rugby union players
Expatriate rugby union players in Argentina